Arum italicum is a species of flowering herbaceous perennial plant in the family Araceae, also known as Italian arum and Italian lords-and-ladies. It is native to the Mediterranean region (southern Europe, northern Africa, and the Middle East). It is also naturalized in Great Britain, the Netherlands, Crimea, Caucasus, Canary Islands, Madeira, Azores, Argentina, and scattered locations in America.

Description
It blooms in spring with white flowers that turn to showy red fruit. It is cultivated as an ornamental plant for traditional and woodland shade gardens. Subspecies italicum (the one normally grown in horticulture) has distinctive pale veins on the leaves, whilst subspecies neglectum (known as late cuckoo pint) has faint pale veins, and the leaves may have dark spots. Nonetheless, intermediates between these two subspecies also occur, and their distinctiveness has been questioned. Some gardeners use this arum to underplant with Hosta, as they produce foliage sequentially: when the Hosta withers away, the arum replaces it in early winter, maintaining ground-cover. Numerous cultivars have been developed for garden use, of which A. italicum subsp. italicum 'Marmoratum' has gained the Royal Horticultural Society's Award of Garden Merit.

Arum italicum can be invasive in some areas.

Arum italicum may hybridize with Arum maculatum. The status of two subspecies currently included in Arum italicum, subsp. albispathum (Crimea to the Caucasus) and subsp. canariense (Macaronesia), is uncertain and they may represent independent species.

In 1778, Lamarck noticed that the inflorescence of this plant produces heat.

Leaves, fruits and rhizomes contain compounds that make them poisonous. Notably, leaves are rich in oxalic acid; other active principles are present in other parts. The ingestion of berries, which are showy and red, can be fatal for babies and young children, as well as dogs.

Gallery

Taxonomy
Within the genus, A. italicum belongs to subgenus Arum, section Arum.

A. italicum generally has a chromosome count of 2n = 84, except that a few subspecies (such as subsp. albispathum) have 2n = 56.

References

External links

Missouri Botanical Garden - Kemper Center for Home Gardening - Arum italicum
 Invasive Plant Atlas Italian arum  - Arum italicum

italicum
Flora of Europe
Plants described in 1768
Medicinal plants
Garden plants of Europe
Poisonous plants
Plant toxins
Neurotoxins
Taxa named by Philip Miller